This is a list of sovereign states and dependent territories in the Caribbean.

In a general sense, the Caribbean can be taken to mean all the nations in and around the Caribbean Sea that lie within an area that stretches from The Bahamas in the north to Guyana in the south, and Suriname in the east to Belize in the west. This is an expanse (mostly of ocean) which measures about 1,000 miles (1,600 kilometres) from north to south, and over 2,500 miles (4,000 kilometres) from east to west.

When the Central and South American nations that border the Caribbean Sea (many of which have a cultural and linguistic heritage that sets their history out of the scope of the region) are excluded, the Caribbean covers the same geographical area as the West Indies, containing a total of 13 sovereign states and 12 island territories that remain dependencies in one form or another, to the countries of France, the Netherlands, the United Kingdom, and the United States.

Sovereign states 
Most sovereign states in the Caribbean (and one British overseas territory) are members of the Caribbean Community, which is an international organisation formed to promote regional integration and collaboration among its members.

Note that Bermuda is a member of the Caribbean Community, though the island nation lies in the North Atlantic Ocean, not in the Caribbean.

Other than 13 Caribbean island countries, three continental mainland countries, namely Belize, Guyana, and Suriname, have also been included in the following table.

Dependent territories 
Montserrat is a member of both the Caribbean Community and the Organisation of Eastern Caribbean States despite being a dependent territory of the United Kingdom. Guadeloupe and Martinique; the Caribbean Netherlands (BES islands); as well as the Federal Dependencies of Venezuela and Nueva Esparta; are not included here because they are not technically dependent territories of France, the Kingdom of the Netherlands, and Venezuela respectively, instead they are integral parts of the countries mentioned. Navassa Island, an uninhabited disputed territory administered by the United States and claimed by Haiti, is also excluded.

The phrase "Caribbean countries" 
Depending on the speaker and the context, the phrase "Caribbean countries" can have a variety of meanings, such as those shown in the images below.

See also 
 Caribbean Free Trade Association
 Greater Antilles
 Hispanic America
 Ibero-America
 Languages of the Caribbean
 Lesser Antilles
 List of Caribbean countries by population
 Lucayan Archipelago
 West Indies

References 

Sovereign

Caribbean
Caribbean